John Hyndman (1723–1762) was a Church of Scotland minister who served as Moderator of the General Assembly of the Church of Scotland, the highest position in the Scottish church.

Life 

He was born in 1723 in Greenock the son of John Hyndman, a shipmaster. He trained for the church at Glasgow University

He was ordained as minister of Colinton Parish Church (south-west of Edinburgh) in November 1746. In February 1752 he was translated to St Cuthbert's Church, Edinburgh in place of Rev Thomas Pitcairn. King's College, Aberdeen awarded him a Doctor of Divinity in 1761 for his many religious books. In the summer of 1761 (whilst still at St Cuthberts) he was elected Moderator of the General Assembly, the highest position in the Church of Scotland. In October 1761 (during his year as Moderator) he translated to Lady Yester's Church in Edinburgh.

He died on 10 August 1762 during his term of office as Moderator and was replaced by Rev Robert Trail.

Family

He was married to Margaret Dalrymple of Dreghorn Castle (1723–1811).

Publications

A Sermon on Proverbs XIV 34 (1761)

References
 

1723 births
1762 deaths
People from Greenock
Academics of the University of Glasgow
Moderators of the General Assembly of the Church of Scotland